B Stiff is the first EP by American new wave band Devo, released in 1978 by Stiff Records.

Background
B Stiff is a compilation of three 7-inch singles released by Stiff in the UK, the first two of which had initially been released independently by the band. The EP collects the only three Devo singles released by Stiff. The cover was created by graphic designer Barney Bubbles and photographer Brian Griffin.

Availability 

Although the B Stiff EP has never had a proper CD release, five of its six tracks have been re-released on various compilation albums in the digital format:

 "Jocko Homo" – Pioneers Who Got Scalped: The Anthology
 "(I Can't Get Me No) Satisfaction" – Greatest Misses, Hardcore Devo: Volume One
 "Be Stiff" – Greatest Misses, Pioneers Who Got Scalped: The Anthology
 "Mongoloid" – Pioneers Who Got Scalped: The Anthology (A slightly different mix appeared on Hardcore Devo: Volume One.)
 "Sloppy (I Saw My Baby Getting)" – Recombo DNA (The extra few seconds of drum noise and shouting before the song starts have been removed from this version.)

A re-recording of "Social Fools" produced by Brian Eno appeared as the B-side of the "Come Back Jonee" single in 1978. It was later reissued as a bonus track on the Virgin CD release of Q: Are We Not Men A: We Are Devo!/Dev-O Live EP in 1993 and was subsequently reissued again on Social Fools (The Virgin Singles 1978-1982) in 2015 and Turn Around: B-Sides & More (1978-1984) in 2019.

Track listing 
Side one
 "Jocko Homo" (Mark Mothersbaugh) – 3:21
 "(I Can't Get No) Satisfaction" (Mick Jagger, Keith Richards) – 2:53
 "Be Stiff" (Gerald V. Casale, Bob Lewis) – 2:35

Side two
 "Mongoloid" (G.V. Casale) – 3:30
 "Sloppy (I Saw My Baby Getting)" (M. Mothersbaugh, Bob Mothersbaugh, G.V. Casale, Gary Jackett) – 2:20
 "Social Fools" (G.V. Casale, M. Mothersbaugh) – 2:52

Personnel 
Devo

Bob Casale – rhythm guitar, additional keyboards, occasional backing vocals
Gerald Casale – bass guitar, additional keyboards, lead vocals
Bob Mothersbaugh – lead guitar, backing vocals
Jim Mothersbaugh – electronic drums
Mark Mothersbaugh – keyboards, occasional guitar, lead vocals
Alan Myers – drums

Technical
Devo – producers
Brian Eno – producer ("Be Stiff")

References 

Devo EPs
1977 debut EPs
Stiff Records EPs